Time on My Hands is a studio album by jazz musician John Scofield. Featuring tenor saxophonist Joe Lovano, veteran bassist Charlie Haden and drummer Jack DeJohnette. It was the first of seven studio albums Scofield released on Blue Note Records from 1990-1999. It was also the first of Scofield's records to feature Lovano, who went on to record several more quartet albums and tour with Scofield in the early 1990s.

Track listing
All compositions written by John Scofield
"Wabash III" – 6:20
"Since You Asked" – 6:10
"So Sue Me" – 5:58
"Let's Say We Did" – 4:22
"Flower Power" – 4:57
"Stranger to the Light" – 7:27
"Nocturnal Mission" – 4:13
"Farmacology" – 6:40
"Time and Tide" – 5:48 (CD only)
"Be Hear Now" – 6:50 (CD only)
"Fat Lip" – 3:45 (CD only)

Personnel
John Scofield - guitar
Joe Lovano - saxophone
Charlie Haden - bass
Jack DeJohnette - drums

References 

1990 albums
John Scofield albums
Blue Note Records albums